Aesthetic Plastic Surgery  is a bimonthly peer-reviewed medical journal covering all aspects of aesthetic plastic surgery. It was established in 1976 and is published by Springer Science+Business Media on behalf of the International Society of Aesthetic Plastic Surgery. It is the official journal of the European Association of Societies of Aesthetic Plastic Surgery and the Sociedade Brasileira de Cirurgia Plastica. The editor-in-chief is Bahman Guyuron

Abstracting and indexing 
The journal is abstracted and indexed in Science Citation Index Expanded, PubMed/MEDLINE, Scopus, EMBASE, Academic OneFile, Current Contents/Clinical Medicine, and INIS Atomindex. According to the Journal Citation Reports, the journal has a 2020 impact factor of 2.326.

References

External links
 
 International Society of Aesthetic Plastic Surgery
 Cosmetic Surgeons Directory for Aesthetic Plastic Surgery

Springer Science+Business Media academic journals
Surgery journals
English-language journals
Bimonthly journals
Publications established in 1976